The Rise and Fall of Bossanova (A 13:23:32 Song) is the fifth album by Michael J Bostwick for his musical project Pipe Choir Three (abbreviated P C III). It was released on November 1, 2016, through the Creative Commons independent label Pipe Choir. 

Despite being broken up into five tracks, the entire album is one continuous song. The album held the Guinness World Record from 2016 to 2020 for longest song officially released.

Track listing

References 

New-age albums
World record holders